Laura Herrera Boxo (Santa Cruz de Tenerife, 11 July 1989) is a Spanish basketball player, who plays as center. She currently plays in CB Bembibre in the Spanish first division. She is a member of the Spanish national senior team, besides having represented Spain in under-age categories.

Awards and accomplishments 
 2004 European champion U16 (Italy) 
 2005 European champion U16 (Poland)
 2006 European champion U18 (Spain)  
 2007 Silver medal European U18 (Serbia)  
 2007 4th position World U19 (Bratislava) 
 2008 4th position European U20 (Italy) 
 2009 Silver medal European U20 (Poland)
 2011 Copa de la Reina champion (Rivas Ecópolis) 
 2015 Bronze Medal Eurobasket (Hungary and Romania)

References

External links 
 Index card and statistical in the official web of the Feb

1989 births
Living people
CB Estudiantes players
Centers (basketball)
Sportspeople from Santa Cruz de Tenerife